These are the Australian Country number-one albums of 2004, per the ARIA Charts.

See also
2004 in music
List of number-one albums of 2004 (Australia)

References

2004
Aust
Count